The 1952 Victorian state election was held in the Australian state of Victoria on Saturday 6 December 1952 to elect 65 members of the state's Legislative Assembly.

Results

Legislative Assembly

|}

See also
Candidates of the 1952 Victorian state election
Members of the Victorian Legislative Assembly, 1952–1955
Members of the Victorian Legislative Council, 1952–1955
1952 Victorian Legislative Council election

References

1952 elections in Australia
Elections in Victoria (Australia)
1950s in Victoria (Australia)
December 1952 events in Australia